Juan Sebastián Cabal and Alejandro Falla were the defending champions, but Cabal didn't start this year.
Falla partnered with Alejandro González and they won this tournament, after defeating Sebastián Decoud and Diego Álvarez 5–7, 6–4, [10–8] in the final.

Seeds

Draw

Draw

References
 Doubles Draw

Copa Petrobras Bogota - Doubles
Copa Petrobras Bogotá